Jemima Annor Yeboah, better known by the stage name Jayana, is a Ghanaian contemporary gospel singer, songwriter and entrepreneur. She was adjudged the female vocalist of the year in 2020 at the Ghana Urban Gospel Music Awards.

Early life 
Born Jemima Annor-Yeboah, Jayana was born into a family of singers. She is the second daughter of the Late Bishop Dr Augustine Annor-Yeboah, founder of Christian Praise International Centre (CPIC) and a former Chairman of the Christ Apostolic Church (CAC). She has four sisters, Mavis, Deborah, Karen and Julie. During Jayana's formative years as a child of a Reverend minister, she spent a part of her time listening and learning contemporary gospel, and praise and worship.

Music career 
Jayana participated in the maiden edition of Ghanaian popular music talent show, Charterhouse's Stars of The Future television show, competing with the likes of Efya, Irene Logan, Ramzy Prince and others and was among the finalist of the first season of stars of the future.

She has performed on major platforms, In 2007 she performed at the Vodafone Ghana Music Awards industrial awards night and has since been seen collaborating and performing on the same stage with numerous Ghanaian musicians including, Joyce Blessing, Grace Ashy, Selina Boateng, Shatta Wale, Kuami Eugene, KiDi,

In 2019 she released a single titled Victory featuring Joyce Blessing.

In 2020 during the COVID-19 lock down period in Ghana, she released 'I Believe' as a motivational single to Ghanaians. She also released her current song titled 'Who You Are'

Discography 
Singles

 Victory
 Who You Are
 I Believe 
 Awurade [God] 
 Gye W'ayeyi featuring Aduhemaa 
 He Reigns

Awards and nomination 

 Jayana wins Female Vocalist of the Year at Ghana National Gospel Music Awards 
 Jayana signs ambassadorial deal with Amanex Company Ltd
 Jayana is brand ambassador for Ageless Day Spa|date = 14 January 2023}}</ref> https://www.graphic.com.gh/entertainment/showbiz-news/jayana-is-brand-ambassador-for-ageless-day-spa.html

References

External links
JAYANA MUSIC
Who is Jemima Annor Yeboah (Jayana)

21st-century Ghanaian singers
Living people
Ghanaian women singers
Ghanaian gospel singers
Year of birth missing (living people)